James Miller Sutherland (June 30, 1853 – 1921) was a lawyer and political figure in Prince Edward Island, Canada. He represented 1st Queens in the Legislative Assembly of Prince Edward Island from 1887 to 1891 as a Liberal member.

He was born in Park Corner, Prince Edward Island, the son of John S. Sutherland, a Scottish immigrant. Sutherland was educated at Prince of Wales College in Charlottetown, was called to the bar in 1877 and set up practice in Charlottetown. He married Isabella Henderson. He resigned his seat in the provincial assembly in 1891.

References 
The Canadian parliamentary companion, 1887 JA Gemmill

1853 births
1921 deaths
People from Queens County, Prince Edward Island
Prince Edward Island Liberal Party MLAs